The Louth county football team represents Louth in men's Gaelic football and is governed by Louth GAA, the county board of the Gaelic Athletic Association. The team competes in the three major annual inter-county competitions; the All-Ireland Senior Football Championship, the Leinster Senior Football Championship and the National Football League.

Louth's home ground is Drogheda Park, Drogheda. The team's manager is Mickey Harte.

The team last won the Leinster Senior Championship in 1957, the All-Ireland Senior Championship in 1957 and has never won the National League.

History
The earliest recorded inter-county football match took place in 1712 when Louth faced Meath at Slane. A fragment of a poem from 1806 records a football match between Louth and Fermanagh at Inniskeen, Co Monaghan.

When Louth GAA sent the team into training in Dundalk for the 1913 Croke Memorial replay under a soccer trainer from Belfast, the move caused more than a ripple through the Association. For thirty years full-time training in bursts of a week or so before a big match were common. After that the two or three times a week gatherings became more popular.

Between 1945 and 1953 Louth and Meath met 13 times. The crowds got bigger and bigger each time as they played draw after draw in the Championship. The attendance of 42,858 at a thrilling 1951 replay remained a record for a provincial match other than a final for forty years the four match series between Meath and Dublin in 1991. The rivalry with Meath has never fizzled out, as witnessed by a stirring Leinster semi-final in 1998. Nor has controversy, as witnessed by Graham Geraghty's "wide" 45th minute point. 
In 1957 showband star Dermot O'Brien was late for the All-Ireland final and joined the team when the parade was completed. Prior to the game O'Brien had captained the side in the semi final success, when the regular captain Patsy Coleman had been injured. Both Ardee men tossed a coin to see who would captain the team. O'Brien won the toss. Coleman today still has the match ball.  O'Brien played a key role as Louth beat Cork with the help of a goal from Sean Cunningham with five minutes to go. Dermot O'Brien died on 21 May 2007.
As both Cork and Louth wear Red and White, on that day Louth wore the green of Leinster, while Cork wore the blue of Munster.

Eamonn McEneaney was manager from 2006 to 2009 and guided them to their most recent success, the O'Byrne Cup when they defeated DCU in the 2009 final played in the Gaelic Grounds in Drogheda.

On 27 June 2010, Louth reached their first Leinster Senior Championship Final in 50 years. During the Leinster Final on 11 July that year, anger and controversy erupted when, during the 74th minute of the match against Meath, a goal was awarded by the referee after brief consultation with only one of the match umpires (although close circuit camera evidence shown on the RTÉ Two coverage of the game proved that the ball was carried over the line by a Meath player). However, Meath received the 2010 Leinster Title and the cup. Louth have been represented by two players in the International Rules versus Australia in recent years, Paddy Keenan and Ciaran Byrne.

2010 Leinster Football Final

On 11 July 2010, Louth reached the Leinster Senior Football Championship Final where they took on neighbours Meath. Meath won what was a highly controversial match. Deep into injury time in the 74th minute of the match, the referee awarded a highly contentious goal to Meath. He did so after a brief consultation with only one of the match umpires, although television coverage of the game showed that the ball had been carried over the line by Meath player Joe Sherdian. Prior to the referee's decision, Meath were trailing Louth by one point. The referee blew his whistle shortly afterwards. The "goal" proved to be the decisive score.

Irate Louth fans stormed the pitch and commenced a process of chasing and physically assaulting the referee, who had to be led away by a Garda escort in scenes broadcast to a live television audience. Other scenes of violence saw bottles being hurled from a stand, one striking a steward who fell to the ground and Meath substitute Mark Ward was hit by a Louth fan.

The situation led to much media debate in the days that followed, the violence was condemned and there were many calls in the national media for the game to be replayed (including from former Meath players Trevor Giles and Bernard Flynn). GAA President Christy Cooney said the events were a "watershed" and one where the "circumstances were bizarre. I have never seen circumstances like it as long as I have been a member of this Association". He promised life bans for those who assaulted the referee. The day after the match the GAA released a statement confirming that Sludden admitted he had made an error. The GAA also stated that the rules left it powerless to offer a replay and that this would be decided by Meath. Following a Meath County Board meeting it emerged that, in his match report, the referee had originally blown for a penalty for Meath but when the ball ended up in the net he decided to award the "goal" instead. The county board decided not to offer a replay and judged that that would be "the end of the matter". This decision was met in some quarters with mixed feelings and commented upon in one national newspaper, the Evening Herald, by three times All-Ireland winning manager Mickey Harte who said the Meath county board was even more culpable because their officers had time to form a considered opinion. In the statement, the Louth County Board spoke of the enormous sense of injustice which was being felt in Louth GAA. They also questioned the referee's official report saying it was contrary to Playing Rules where he indicated in his report that he blew the whistle for a penalty, but then changed his mind and awarded a goal instead. The referee also wrote that "he made a terrible mistake".

Louth County board referred to Rule 6.41 Award //facts of game: The award of the game rests with the committee / council in charge acting on the referees report.

In doing so the Louth County Board intimated that the committee/council in charge erred in leaving the matter to Meath County Board to offer a replay without seeking clarification from the referee in relation to his match report and his statement that "he made a terrible mistake".

The debate concerning which team were official winners of the game is now over, with Meath recorded in the annals of history as the victors. However, numerous TV replays show that the Meath "goal" was indisputably a technical foul with regard to the Playing Rules of Gaelic football, as quoted below and as outlined in the GAA Official Guide. Also Paddy Keenan (St.Patricks) is the only Louth All-Star.  - Part 2.

2010 All-Ireland Qualifiers
Louth exited the All-Ireland championship on 24 July when defeated fairly convincingly by Dublin in the last qualifier round by 2-14 to 0-13.

Since 2010
Fitzpatrick quit as Louth senior manager in 2012 after three years in the role.

Aidan O'Rourke was appointed as Fitzpatrick's successor in October 2012. O'Rourke left the role in mid-2014.

Former player Colin Kelly then managed Louth for three years. He led Louth to successive promotions in the National Football League in 2016 and 2017, though Louth did not make any championship impact during his time in charge.

Louth appointed former minor manager Wayne Kierans as senior team manager on a two-year term in October 2018.

Louth was relegated to Division 4 in 2020.

Louth did not renew Kierans's contract.

In November 2020, Mickey Harte was appointed manager for an expected three-year period. Gavin Devlin was appointed assistant.

Current panel

INJ Player has had an injury which has affected recent involvement with the county team.
RET Player has since retired from the county team.
WD Player has since withdrawn from the county team due to a non-injury issue.

Current management team
Manager: Mickey Harte
Assistant: Gavin Devlin
Goalkeeping coach: Steve Williams

Managerial history

Players

Notable players

All Stars

2010: Paddy Keenan

Team of the Millennium
The team below was chosen from a list of 75 nominees by the County Board in February 2000. Their aim was to select the best 15 players who had ever played for Louth in their respective positions, since the foundation of the GAA in 1884 up to the Millennium year, 2000.

Louth captains (1950 - )

Honours

National
All-Ireland Senior Football Championship
 Winners (3): 1910, 1912, 1957
 Runners-up (3): 1887, 1909, 1950
National Football League
 Runners-up (1): 1948–49
National Football League Division 2
 Winners (2): 1999-2000, 2006
National Football League Division 3
 Winners (4): 1982–83, 1987–88, 2011, 2022
National Football League Division 4
 Winners (2): 2016, 2021 (shared with Antrim)
Tommy Murphy Cup
 Winners (1): 2006
All-Ireland 'B' Football Championship
 Winners (1): 1997
 
All-Ireland Junior Football Championship
 Winners (4): 1925, 1932, 1934, 1961
All-Ireland Minor Football Championship
 Winners (2): 1936, 1940
 Runners-up (2): 1931, 1941

Provincial
Leinster Senior Football Championship
 Winners (9): 1909, 1910, 1912, 1943, 1948, 1950, 1953, 1957
 Runners-up (14): 1889, 1892, 1900, 1905, 1913, 1914, 1918, 1934, 1935, 1937, 1952, 1958, 1960, 2010
O'Byrne Cup
 Winners (4): 1963, 1980, 1990, 2009
Leinster Junior Football Championship
 Winners (10): 1910, 1912, 1925, 1928, 1932, 1934, 1946, 1957, 1961, 2009, 2010
Leinster Under-21 Football Championship
 Winners (3): 1970, 1978, 1981
 Runners-up (4): 1979, 1983, 1996, 2012
Leinster Minor Football Championship
 Winners (8): 1931, 1935, 1936, 1940, 1941, 1942, 1951, 1953
 Runners-up (8): 1932, 1937, 1938, 1939, 1958, 1960, 1971, 2017
Owen Treacy Cup
 Winners (1): 2006

References

 
County football teams